Mexichromis similaris is a species of sea slug or dorid nudibranch, a marine gastropod mollusk in the family Chromodorididae.

Distribution
This nudibranch is found in the tropical Western Pacific Ocean.

Description
Mexichromis similaris has a pale-lilac or violet body, with pale-orange gills and rhinophores.  The mantle is edged with a white band, and there is a long white line running down its dorsum. This species is easily confused with other similarly coloured nudibranchs, especially Hypselodoris shimodaensis and Mexichromis trilineata.

This nudibranch can reach a total length of at least 14 mm, and like all  Chromodorids, feeds on sponges.

References

Chromodorididae
Gastropods described in 1986